Road 95 is the most important north–south road in eastern Iran. It connects Mashhad to Torbat e Heydariyeh, Birjand, Zahedan and then Chabahar.

References

External links 

 Iran road map on Young Journalists Club

Roads in Iran
Transportation in Razavi Khorasan Province
Transportation in South Khorasan Province
Transportation in Sistan and Baluchestan Province